David Gower is an English former cricketer who batted with a graceful style as part of the top order for the England cricket team for over a decade. He scored centuries (100 or more runs in a single innings) on 18 occasions in Test cricket, and 7 times in One Day International (ODI) matches. He was named as a Wisden Cricketer of the Year in 1979 for his performances the previous year, which included being the youngest batsman to score a century for England since Peter May in 1951. He was appointed to the Order of the British Empire (OBE) in 1992 for services to sports, and in 2009 was inducted into the ICC Cricket Hall of Fame.

Gower made his Test debut for England in June 1978 against Pakistan at Edgbaston, Birmingham. He achieved his first century in Test cricket later that year, scoring 111 runs against New Zealand at The Oval, London. The following summer, Gower scored his first double-century, remaining unbeaten on 200 off 279 deliveries, in a batting innings described as "effortless" by the Wisden Cricketers' Almanack. He did not pass a hundred again until 1981, when he scored 154 not out against the West Indies, his runs coming off 403 deliveries at a strike rate of 38.21 – his lowest when scoring a century. Across 1984 and 1985, Gower struck five centuries in Test cricket, and on each occasion he passed 150 runs. Three of these centuries were scored during the 1985 Ashes, in which Gower was named as Man of the Series. In the fifth match he reached his highest score in Test cricket, amassing 215 runs and sharing a partnership of 331 with Tim Robinson. At the time, it was the sixth largest partnership for England, but in the next match Gower and Graham Gooch surpassed it, putting on 351 runs together. Gower's final Test century was scored in January 1991, when he reached 123 against Australia. In total, nine of Gower's eighteen Test centuries came during Ashes series, the fourth most by any batsman.

In ODI cricket, Gower's first century came in his second match for England, played against Pakistan in 1978, when he was 114 not out at the close of the innings. He was most prolific in 1983, when he scored four of his seven centuries in ODIs. Three of these centuries were scored against New Zealand during the 1982–83 World Series Cup, earning him the accolade of Man of the Preliminary Series. In the fourth match of the competition he scored 158 runs, which in the context of ODI cricket was both his highest score, and at the time, the highest score by any England batsman. Despite playing ODI cricket for England until 1991, Gower's final century in the format came in June 1985 against Australia, when he scored 102.

Key
 * denotes that he remained not out.
  denotes that he was the captain of the England team in that match.
 M denotes that he was named Man of the match.
 Pos. denotes his position in the batting order.
 Test denotes the number of the Test match played in that series.
 Inn. denotes the number of innings in the match.
 H/A/N denotes whether the venue is home (England), away (opposition's home) or neutral.
 Date denotes the date on which the match began.
 Lost denotes that the match was lost by England.
 Won denotes that the match was won by England.
 Drawn denotes that the match was drawn.
 S/R denotes strike rate.

Test centuries

ODI centuries

Notes and references
Notes

References

External links
 Player Profile: David Gower from ESPNcricinfo
 Player Profile: David Gower from CricketArchive

English cricket lists
Gower, David